
Toruń County is a unit of territorial administration and local government (powiat) in Kuyavian-Pomeranian Voivodeship, north-central Poland. It was created on January 1, 1999, as a result of the Polish local government reforms passed in 1998. Its administrative seat is the city of Toruń, although the city is not part of the county (it constitutes a separate city county). The only town in Toruń County is Chełmża, which lies nineteen kilometers (twelve miles) north of Toruń.

As of 2019 its total population is 107,641, out of which the population of Chełmża is 14,503  and the rural population is 93,138.

Neighboring counties
Apart from the city of Toruń, Toruń County is also bordered by Chełmno County to the north, Wąbrzeźno County to the north-east, Golub-Dobrzyń County and Lipno County to the east, Aleksandrów County to the south, Inowrocław County to the south-west, and the city of Bydgoszcz and Bydgoszcz County to the west.

Administrative division
The county is subdivided into nine gminas (one urban and eight rural). These are listed in the following table, in descending order of population.

References

 
Land counties of Kuyavian-Pomeranian Voivodeship